The 1814 Connecticut gubernatorial election took place on April 11, 1814.

Incumbent Federalist Governor John Cotton Smith defeated Democratic-Republican nominee Elijah Boardman in a re-match of the previous year's election.

General election

Candidates
Elijah Boardman, Democratic-Republican, former member of the Connecticut House of Representatives, Democratic-Republican nominee for Governor in 1812 and 1813
John Cotton Smith, Federalist, incumbent Governor

Results

References

Gubernatorial
Connecticut
1814